The 2021 Open Ciudad de Valencia was a professional women's tennis tournament played on outdoor clay courts. It was the fifth edition of the tournament which was part of the 2021 ITF Women's World Tennis Tour. It took place in Valencia, Spain between 20 and 26 September 2021.

Singles main-draw entrants

Seeds

 1 Rankings are as of 13 September 2021.

Other entrants
The following players received wildcards into the singles main draw:
  Jéssica Bouzas Maneiro
  Ángela Fita Boluda
  Andrea Gámiz
  Rebeka Masarova

The following player received entry using a junior exempt:
  Diane Parry

The following players received entry from the qualifying draw:
  Naiktha Bains
  Marina Bassols Ribera
  Ilona Georgiana Ghioroaie
  María Gutiérrez Carrasco
  Funa Kozaki
  Andreea Prisăcariu
  Leyre Romero Gormaz
  Iryna Shymanovich

The following players received entry as lucky losers:
  Amanda Carreras
  Eva Guerrero Álvarez

Champions

Singles

 Arantxa Rus def.  Mihaela Buzărnescu, 6–4, 7–6(7–3)

Doubles

  Aliona Bolsova /  Andrea Gámiz def.  Ekaterine Gorgodze /  Laura Pigossi, 6–3, 6–4

References

External links
 2021 Open Ciudad de Valencia at ITFtennis.com
 Official website

2021 ITF Women's World Tennis Tour
2021 in Spanish tennis
September 2021 sports events in Spain